The 2016–17 Slovenian Futsal Cup was the 22nd edition of Slovenia's futsal knockout competition. Brezje Maribor were the defending champions, having won their first title in the 2015–16 edition. They successfully defended their title by defeating Bronx Škofije 6–2 in the final.

Competition format

Qualified teams

2015–16 Slovenian Futsal League (top 8)
 Oplast Kobarid
 Brezje Maribor
 Dobovec
 Litija
 Sevnica
 Puntar
 Bronx Škofije
 Benedikt

Qualified through MNZ Regional Cups
 Black and White
 Stripy
 Slovenske Gorice
 Mlinše
 Zavas
 Tomaž
 Gorica
 Kebelj pizzeria Salama

Round of 16

|}

Quarter-finals

|}

Final four
Bronx Škofije, Brezje Maribor, Sevnica and Gorica have qualified for the final tournament, which was held in Podčetrtek.

Bracket

Semi-finals

Final

References

Slovenian Futsal Cup
Futsal Cup
Slovenia